Sveti Đurađ, Serbo-Croatian for "St. George", may refer to:

 Sveti Đurađ, Osijek-Baranja County, a village near Donji Miholjac, Croatia
 Sveti Đurađ, Virovitica-Podravina County, a village near Virovitica, Croatia
 the former name of Žitište, Serbia

See also
 Sveti Đurđ, a village and municipality in Varaždin County, Croatia